Felipe Claybrooks (born January 22, 1978 in Decatur, Georgia) is a former defensive end in the National Football League and NFL Europa. He played for the Cleveland Browns and the Cologne Centurions. He was a standout athlete at Decatur High School, and went on to attend Georgia Tech for college.

Living people
1978 births
Players of American football from Atlanta
American football defensive ends
Georgia Tech Yellow Jackets football players
Cleveland Browns players
Cologne Centurions (NFL Europe) players
Philadelphia Soul players